Mr. Money Mustache is the website and pseudonym of -year-old Canadian-born blogger Peter Adeney. Adeney retired from his job as a software engineer in 2005 at age 30 by spending only a small percentage of his annual salary and consistently investing the remainder, primarily in stock market index funds. Adeney lives in Longmont, Colorado, and contends that most middle-class individuals can and should spend less money and own fewer physical possessions.  He argues that by doing this, they can live with increased financial freedom and happiness, reducing their environmental footprint in the process. He has described the typical middle-class lifestyle as "an exploding volcano of wastefulness," particularly citing the overuse of and overspending on new cars as an example. The blog has been featured and cited in various media outlets including Market Watch, CBS News, and The New Yorker, as well as others. Adeney was featured in the 2022 Netflix documentary Get Smart with Money 

He is the brother of Chris Adeney, a Canadian indie rock musician better known by the stage name Wax Mannequin.

Retirement story
The primary aspect of the blog which has caught the attention of many media outlets is Pete Adeney's extremely early retirement at age 30. Adeney and his then-wife both worked in software engineering, averaging an income of approximately $67,000 per year, per person, over the course of their careers. They lived frugally, investing the majority of their take-home pay during their working years. At the time of their retirement, they had amassed approximately $600,000 in investments in addition to a mortgage-free house valued at about $200,000.

Adeney believes in the 4% rule, which states that, with a balanced investment portfolio, a retiree can withdraw 4% of their portfolio's initial value each year, adjusted upward for inflation each year thereafter, with a low probability of ever running out of money. His portfolio was valued at $600,000 at the time of his retirement, which could support his family's annual expenditures of about $25,000 indefinitely according to this rule.

Adeney has made considerable money aside from his initial investment portfolio since he retired from his software engineering job in 2005, through the blog and other sources of income, but he maintains that none of this additional money was ever necessary to fund his family's normal expenses.

Community
The website includes an active internet forum for discussion of personal finance matters outside of the blog's comment threads. People who read the Mr. Money Mustache blog and subscribe to its philosophy are known as "Mustachians." Many of the forum's discussions are focused on topics unique to this niche community, such as frugal living, investing large sums of money, and retiring extremely early.

Readers of the blog gather in person regularly at so-called "Mustachian Meetups" around the world to share experiences and tips on how to live a lifestyle conducive to wealth building, early retirement, happiness, and environmentalism.

In 2017, Adeney introduced "The MMM World Headquarters Building," a physical location in Longmont, Colorado, dedicated to the Mustachian movement.

Common topics
The blog's topics often include:
Early retirement
Financial independence
Frugality and simple living
Anti-consumerism
Consumer debt
The cost of driving cars
Bicycling
The philosophy of happiness
Do-it-yourself work ethic
Environmentalism
Credit card churning and travel hacking

See also
FIRE movement

References

External links
Official website

Finance websites
Financial services companies established in 2011
Internet properties established in 2011
American blogs
Simple living advocates
Retirement
People from Longmont, Colorado
Writers from Ontario